Thanasit Jaturaput (also known as Ton, born 4 July 1989) is a Thai singer and the winner of the eighth season of Academy Fantasia, a reality singing television competition.

Early life and education 
Thanasit was born in Bangkok, Thailand. He is the brother of Thai singer . He completed his secondary education at Samsenwittayalai School. He was able to receive a scholarship for the AFS intercultural program where he had the opportunity to become an international exchange student for one year in Boise, Idaho and later on graduated with a bachelor's degree from the Faculty of Journalism and Mass Communication at Thammasat University.

Career 
With his father being a folk singer in a university, his inclination for music started at an early age. He was able to develop this passion further when he went to the United States as an international exchange student where he became part of a choir club and took harmonizing classes. This made him realize that singing was his "destiny" and that he wanted to become a singer. He also became a fan of soul music which he describes as "powerful both emotionally and vocally."

This paved the way for him to audition in Academy Fantasia. After failing twice in the auditions, he was eager to keep auditioning until the competition's maximum age regulation. He eventually made it to the show's eighth season in 2011 where he became the winner. Aside from the ฿350,000 cash prize, he also received a condominium unit worth ฿6 million at that time.

He is currently under the management of Musiccream since 2019.

He has also been active in the theater industry performing in musicals such as the "Baan Ruen Khieng Kan: Suntaraporn the Musical" and "Dreamgirls".

Discography

References

External links 
 
 

1989 births
Living people
Thanasit Jaturaput
Thanasit Jaturaput
Thanasit Jaturaput